Antonio Ottoboni (1646–1720) was a Neapolitan general, nephew of Pope Alexander VIII and the father of Cardinal Pietro Ottoboni.

Prince Antonio Ottoboni, a general of the papal army, came to Naples in 1694.

Like his son, Cardinal Ottoboni, Prince Antonio was an enthusiastic patron of music. He supplied the libretto for Alessandro Scarlatti's second smaller setting of La Giuditta in 1697, and texts for many cantatas. Before 1707, probably in 1703 or 1704, he appointed Scarlatti his maestro di cappella.

References

1646 births
1710 deaths
Italian opera librettists
Italian male dramatists and playwrights
17th-century Italian nobility
Captains General of the Church
Antonio